Chris Moody (born 19 October 1953) is an English professional golfer.

Moody turned professional in 1973 and joined the European Tour in 1979. He made the top one hundred on the European Tour Order of Merit twelve times between 1980 and 1992, with a best ranking of nineteenth in 1988. It was in 1988 that he collected his only European Title at that year's Ebel European Masters Swiss Open. He also had two second places finishes on the tour. In 2004 he played on the European Seniors Tour, but he did not achieve any top ten finishes.

Professional wins (1)

European Tour wins (1)

Other wins (1)
1988 Grand Prix Triconfort (France)

Results in major championships 

Note: Moody only played in The Open Championship.

CUT = missed the half-way cut (3rd round cut in 1984 and 1985 Open Championships)
"T" = tied

External links 

English male golfers
European Tour golfers
European Senior Tour golfers
Golfers from London
1953 births
Living people